, prov. designation: , is a minor planet and the first Neptune trojan discovered, by American astronomer Marc Buie of the Deep Ecliptic Survey at Cerro Tololo Observatory in Chile on 21 August 2001.

Other Neptune trojans have been discovered since. A study by American astronomers Scott Sheppard and Chad Trujillo from the Carnegie Institution suggests that Neptune could possibly have twenty times more trojans than Jupiter.

Orbit 

 orbits the Sun with a semi-major axis of 30.115 AU at a distance of 29.3–31.0 AU once every 165 years and 3 months (60,363 days). Its orbit has an eccentricity of 0.03 and an inclination of 1° with respect to the ecliptic.

Dynamical stability 

Thereafter, the stability of Neptune trojans was simply assumed.

A more recent study, which used a very large number of test particles spread over the 3σ uncertainties in all six orbital parameters derived from a longer observational arc, has indicated that  is far less dynamically stable than previously thought. The test particles were lost exponentially with a half life of 553 Myr. Further observations can determine whether 's orbit is actually within the dynamically stable or within the unstable part.

The stability is strongly dependent on semi-major axis, with a≥30.30 AU being far less stable, but only very weakly dependent on the other orbital parameters. This is because those with larger semi-major axes have larger libration amplitudes, with amplitudes ~70° and above being destabilized by secondary resonances between the trojan motion and the dynamics of at least Saturn, Uranus, and Neptune.

Numbering and naming 

This minor planet was numbered and its discoverer determined by the Minor Planet Center on 28 March 2022. If named, it will follow the naming scheme already established with 385571 Otrera, which is to name these objects after figures related to the Amazons, an all-female warrior tribe that fought in the Trojan War on the side of the Trojans against the Greek.

Physical characteristics 

The discoverers estimate that the body has a mean-diameter of 132 kilometers with a low albedo of 0.058 at an absolute magnitude of 8.12. It has a visual magnitude of 22.5.

References

External links 
 
 

612243
612243
20010821